Zoltán Csányi (26 December 1912 – 6 January 1993) was a Hungarian athlete. He competed in the men's decathlon at the 1936 Summer Olympics.

References

External links
 

1912 births
1993 deaths
Athletes (track and field) at the 1936 Summer Olympics
Hungarian decathletes
Olympic athletes of Hungary
People from Esztergom
Sportspeople from Komárom-Esztergom County